Gyula Istvan Zborai (born 18 December 1962) is a Hungarian para table tennis player who competes in international level events. He is a double World bronze medalist and a six-time European medalist.

References

1962 births
Living people
People from Nagykanizsa
Paralympic table tennis players of Hungary
Table tennis players at the 2004 Summer Paralympics
Table tennis players at the 2008 Summer Paralympics
Table tennis players at the 2016 Summer Paralympics
Table tennis players at the 2020 Summer Paralympics
Sportspeople from Zala County
Hungarian male table tennis players
21st-century Hungarian people